is a passenger railway station in located in the town of Nachikatsuura, Higashimuro District, Wakayama Prefecture, Japan, operated by West Japan Railway Company (JR West).

Lines

Station layout
The station consists of two opposed side platforms connected to the station building by a footbridge. The station is unattended.

Platforms

Adjacent stations

|-
!colspan=5|West Japan Railway Company (JR West)

History
Ukui Station opened as Ugui Station on the Shingu Railway on December 4, 1912. The Shingu Railway was nationalized on July 1, 1934, and the station was renamed "Ukui" at that time. With the privatization of the Japan National Railways (JNR( on April 1, 1987, the station came under the aegis of the West Japan Railway Company.

Passenger statistics
In fiscal 2019, the station was used by an average of 64 passengers daily (boarding passengers only).

Surrounding Area
 
Nachikatsuura City Ukui Elementary School

See also
List of railway stations in Japan

References

External links

 Ukui Station (West Japan Railway) 

Railway stations in Wakayama Prefecture
Railway stations in Japan opened in 1912
Nachikatsuura